Sousa, Souza, de Sousa (literally 'from Sousa'), de Souza or D'Souza is a common Portuguese-language surname, especially in Portugal, Brazil, East Timor, India (among Catholics in Goa, Mumbai, and Mangalore), and Galicia.
In Africa, the name is common in former Portuguese colonies, especially among people who have some Portuguese and Brazilian roots in Ghana, Togo, Benin, Nigeria, Angola, São Tomé and Príncipe, Cape Verde, Guinea-Bissau, India, and Mozambique.

Etymology and history
The name comes from the Sousa River in northern Portugal, and the first man who used the surname was the noble of Visigoth origin Egas Gomes de Sousa. Sometimes the spelling is in the archaic form Souza or de Souza, which has occasionally been changed to D'Souza. The Spanish equivalent of this surname is Sosa and it was brought to Galicia (Spain) by the Portuguese.

During the colonial era, the Portuguese built forts along Brazilian and West African coastal areas for trade, many of which were later used for the slave trade. They also had children with local women, and the children were given their fathers' last names.

Some Afro-Brazilians who returned to Africa also carry this last name. Among those are the descendants of Francisco Félix de Sousa, a white Portuguese-Brazilian man from Salvador, Bahia, in Brazil, who founded the De Souza family on the West African coast. He was once the richest man in the region due to his involvement in its slave trade.

Notable people sharing a variation of the surname Sousa

Scientists, academics and technologists
 Gypsyamber D'Souza, American epidemiologist
 Felix Oswald D'Souza ( born 1961), Biryani Engineer from Bangalore 
Marcelo Damy de Souza Santos (1914–2009), Brazilian physicist
 Teotonio R. de Souza (1947–2019), Indian historian
 Raissa D'Souza (born 1969), American theoretical physicist and computer scientist
 Francisco D'Souza (born 1968), Indian American entrepreneur and businessman
 Ronald Bon de Sousa Pernes (born 1940), Canadian philosopher

Visual artists
 Amadeo de Souza Cardoso (1887–1918), Portuguese painter
 Aurélia de Souza (1867–1922), Portuguese painter
 Francis Newton Souza (1924–2002), British painter from Goa
 Mauricio de Sousa (born 1935), Brazilian comic book artist
 Remo D'Souza (born 1974), Indian dancer, choreographer, actor and film director
 Solomon Souza (born 1993), Israeli artist, grandson of Francis Newton Souza
 Sofia Martins de Sousa (1870–1960), Portuguese painter
 Teresa Nunes Alves de Sousa (born 1979), Portuguese artist

Actors and filmmakers
 Andria D'Souza (born 1986), Indian television actress
 Edward de Souza (born 1932), British actor
 Genelia D'Souza (born 1987), Indian actress
 Karla Souza (born 1985), Mexican actress
 Krystal D'Souza (born 1990), Indian television actress
 Marjorie de Sousa (born 1980), Venezuelan actress and model
 Waluscha de Sousa (born 1979), Indian actress and model
 Steven E. de Souza (born 1947), American producer, director and screenwriter
 Sebastian de Souza (born 1993), British actor
 Ansel D'Souza (born 2007), Portuguese actor

Entrepreneurs
 Francis deSouza (born 1970), American entrepreneur and business executive.
 Francisco Félix de Sousa (1754–1849), Portuguese-Brazilian slave trader
 Osmel Sousa (born 1946), Cuban-Venezuelan beauty pageant entrepreneur

Musicians, singers and composers
 Carmen Souza (born 1981), Portuguese-born singer and songwriter of Cape Verde
 Chris de Souza (born 1943), British classical music composer
 Gena Desouza (born 1997), Thai singer and actress
 Indigo de Souza (born 1996), American singer
 João de Sousa Carvalho (1745–1798), Portuguese composer of Baroque operas
 John Philip Sousa (1854–1932), American composer of marches
 Luciana Souza (born 1966), Brazilian singer
 Nikhil D'Souza (born 1981), Indian-born singer, songwriter and guitarist
 Raul de Souza (1934–2021), Brazilian trombonist
 Steve "Zetro" Souza (born 1964), American thrash metal singer

Writers and journalists
 Adelaide Filleul, Marquise de Souza-Botelho (1761–1836), French novelist
 Amílcar de Sousa (1876–1940), Portuguese doctor and author of health books
 Christovão Falcão (1512? – 1557),  Christovão de Sousa Falcão, Portuguese poet
 Dinesh D'Souza (born 1961), Indian-American conservative political commentator, filmmaker and author
 Francis D'Souza, Canadian television executive and broadcaster
 Henrique "Henfil" de Souza Filho (1944–1988), Brazilian cartoonist, caricaturist, journalist and writer
 José de Sousa Saramago (1922–2010), Portuguese novelist, Prémio Camões and Nobel Prize in Literature
 Júlio César de Mello e Souza (1895–1974), Brazilian writer and mathematics professor; used the pen name Malba Tahan
 Luís de Sousa (1555–1632), Portuguese monk and writer
 Manuel de Faria e Sousa (1590–1649), Portuguese historian and poet
 Márcio Souza (born 1946), Brazilian novelist, essayist and playwright
 Na D'Souza (born 1937), Indian novelist and Kannada language writer
 Noémia de Sousa (1926–2003), Mozambican journalist and poet
 Ovídio de Sousa Martins (1928–1999), Cape Verdean poet
 Pete Souza (born 1954), American photojournalist, Chief Official White House photographer
 Tony D'Souza, American novelist, journalist and essayist

Political figures
 Aristides de Sousa Mendes (1885–1954), Portuguese diplomat
 Charles Sousa (born 1958), Canadian politician, Minister of Finance for Ontario from 2007
 Christopher de Souza (born 1976), Singaporean Member of Parliament
 Dona Ana de Sousa,  Ngola Ann Nzinga Mbande ( 1583–1663), Angolan queen
 Fitz Remedios Santana de Souza (1929–2020), Kenyan lawyer and politician
 Frances D'Souza, Baroness D'Souza (born 1944), British scientist and former Lord Speaker of the House of Lords
 Francis D'Souza (1954–2019), Indian politician, Deputy Chief Minister of Goa
 Herbert de Souza (1935–1997), Brazilian sociologist, politician and activist
 Jerónimo de Sousa (born 1947), Portuguese politician, General Secretary of the Communist Party
 Jose Philip D'Souza, Indian politician
 José Sócrates Carvalho Pinto de Sousa (born 1957), Portuguese politician and former Prime Minister of Portugal
 Luiz Martins de Souza Dantas (1876–1954), Brazilian diplomat
 Marcelo Rebelo de Sousa (born 1948), Portuguese politician, currently President of Portugal
 Márcio de Souza e Mello (1906–1991), Brazilian former air force general and member of ruling junta
 Martim Afonso de Sousa (c. 1500–1571), Portuguese explorer and first Royal Governor of Brazil
 Paulo Renato Souza (1945–2011), Brazilian economist and politician
 Pedro Lopes de Sousa (? - 1594), Portuguese nobleman and first governor of Portuguese Ceylon
 Sabrina De Sousa (born c. 1956), former American diplomat and ex-CIA operative
 Sérgio Sousa Pinto (born 1972), Portuguese politician, Member of the European Parliament
 Tomé de Sousa (1503–1579), Portuguese nobleman and first governor-general of Brazil
 Washington Luís Pereira de Sousa (1869–1957), last president of the First Brazilian Republic
 Boaventura de Sousa Santos (born 1940), economist and university teacher known for his work on the World Social Forum and on Marxism

Athletes
 Abigail Conceição de Souza (1921–2007), Brazilian footballer
 Adrian D'Souza (born 1984), Indian field hockey player
 Adriano de Souza (born 1987), Brazilian footballer
 Alan Goncalves Sousa (born 1997), Brazilian footballer
 Alexsandro de Souza (born 1977), Brazilian footballer
 Antao D'Souza (born 1939), Pakistani cricketer
 Artur de Sousa Pinga (1909–1963), Portuguese footballer and coach
 Cássio Alessandro de Souza (born 1986), Brazilian footballer
 Claudemir de Souza (born 1988), Brazilian footballer
 Cristiano Pereira de Souza (born 1977), Brazilian footballer
 Darius D'Souza (born 1989), Canadian cricketer
 Deivid de Souza (born 1979), Brazilian footballer
 Douglas Costa de Souza (born 1990), better known as Douglas Costa, Brazilian footballer
 Edson Edmar Dias de Souza,  Mateus Paraná (born 1987), Brazilian footballer
 Erika de Souza (1982), Brazilian basketball player
 Fábio de Souza a.k.a. Fabinho (born 1975), Brazilian footballer
 Frederico Sousa (born 1978), Portuguese rugby player
 Gesias Calvancante Souza a.k.a. JZ Calvan (born 1983), Brazilian MMA fighter
 Givanildo Vieira de Souza a.k.a. Hulk (born 1986), Brazilian footballer
Hélder Wander Sousa de Azevedo e Costa (born 1994), Portuguese footballer
 Hélia Souza (born 1970), Brazilian volleyball player
 Hudson de Souza (born 1977), Brazilian middle distance runner
 Jenílson Ângelo de Souza a.k.a. Júnior (1973), Brazilian footballer
 João de Sousa (1924–2014), Portuguese rower
 João Sousa (born 1989), Portuguese tennis player
 Jorge Luiz Sousa a.k.a. Jorginho (born 1977), Brazilian footballer
 José Augusto Oliveira de Sousa (born 1974), Portuguese darts player
 José Carlos Leite de Sousa a.k.a. Sousa (born 1977), Portuguese footballer
 José Cristiano de Souza Júnior (born 1977), Brazilian footballer
 José Ivanaldo de Souza (born 1975), Brazilian footballer
 Kieren D'Souza (born 1993), Indian ultramarathon runner
 Marcelo de Souza (born 1975), Uruguayan footballer
 Marcelo de Souza Ramos (born 1978), Brazilian footballer
 Márcio Rafael Ferreira de Souza, a.k.a. Rafinha (born 1985), Brazilian footballer
 Marcus Vinicius de Souza, a.k.a. Marcus Vinicius (born 1984), Brazilian basketball player
 Marshall D'Souza (1941–2013), Pakistani-Canadian cricketer
 Nadson Rodrigues de Souza (born 1982), Brazilian footballer
 Paulo Manuel Carvalho de Sousa (born 1970), Portuguese former footballer
 Robert de Pinho de Souza a.k.a. Robert (born 1981), Brazilian footballer
 Robson de Souza a.k.a. Robinho (born 1984), Brazilian footballer
 Rodrigo de Souza Cardoso (born 1982), Brazilian footballer
 Romário de Souza Faria a.k.a. Romário (born 1966), Brazilian former footballer
 Ronaldo Souza dos Santos a.k.a. Jacaré (born 1979), Brazilian MMA fighter
 Sidney de Souza (born 1966), Brazilian sprinter
 Sidney de Souza (equestrian) (born 1973), Brazilian equestrian
 Silvestre de Sousa (born 1980), Brazilian jockey
 Stephie D'Souza (1936–1998), Indian track-and-field athlete and hockey player
 Steven Jeffrey Souza, Jr. (born 1989), American baseball player
 Tony de Souza (born 1974), Peruvian wrestler
 Uênia Fernandes de Souza (born 1984), Brazilian racing cyclist
 Vágner Silva de Souza a.k.a. Vágner Love (born 1984), Brazilian footballer

Religious figures
 Albert D'Souza (born 1945), Indian Roman Catholic Bishop
 Aloysius Paul D'Souza (born 1941), Bishop of the Mangalore Diocese, India
 Basil Salvadore D'Souza (1926–1996), Bishop of the Mangalore Diocese, India
 Felipa de Souza (1556–1600), Portuguese-Brazilian lesbian convicted and tortured by the Inquisition
 Humberto Sousa Medeiros (1915–1983), Catholic Cardinal and Archbishop of Boston, Massachusetts
 James deSouza (1925–2016), Pakistani Roman Catholic priest
 João de Sousa (1647–1710), Archbishop of Lisbon, Portugal
 Norbert D'Souza, president of the All India Catholic Union during 1996–2000

Fictional characters
 Anna De Souza, in Emmerdale TV series
 Bianca DeSousa, in Degrassi: The Next Generation TV series
 Lady Christina de Souza, in an episode of the British TV series Doctor Who
 Daniel Sousa, in the Agent Carter TV series and the Agents of S.H.I.E.L.D. TV series.
 Donald De Souza, in Emmerdale TV series
 Etienne de Sousa, in Dead Man's Folly, a novel by Agatha Christie
 Madame Souza, in The Triplets of Belleville animated film
 Miles De Souza, in Emmerdale TV series
 Rodrigo De Souza, in Mozart in the Jungle TV series by Amazon

Other
 Moise de Souza, Beninese construction engineer and traditional aristocrat, head of the De Souza family
 Dame Rachel de Souza (born 1968), British educationalist, and Children's Commissioner for England

See also
 Sosa (surname), the Spanish equivalent

References

Galician-language surnames
Portuguese-language surnames
Toponymic surnames